"Ain't No Love Lost" is the fourth single by Belgian-Turkish singer Hadise from her debut album Sweat. "Ain't No Love Lost" is an English R&B/Ballad song.

Chart performance
"Ain't No Love Lost" is the lowest charting song on the Belgium Top 50, only spending two weeks on the chart and peaking at 45.

Charts

Track listing
"Ain't No Love Lost"
"Burdayım"

References

2006 singles
Hadise songs
English-language Belgian songs
Songs written by Yves Jongen
2005 songs
Songs written by Hadise